The Roman Catholic Diocese of Eunápolis is a diocese located in the city of Eunápolis in the Ecclesiastical province of São Salvador da Bahia in Brazil.

History
 12 June 1996: Established as Diocese of Eunápolis from the Diocese of Itabuna and Diocese of Teixeira de Freitas–Caravelas

Leadership
 Bishops of Eunápolis (Roman rite)
 Bishop José Edson Santana de Oliveira (12 June 1996 – present)

References
 GCatholic.org
 Catholic Hierarchy

Roman Catholic dioceses in Brazil
Christian organizations established in 1996
Eunápolis, Roman Catholic Diocese of
Roman Catholic dioceses and prelatures established in the 20th century